Matrayevo (Matray) is a rural locality (a selo) and the administrative centre of Matrayevsky Selsoviet, Zilairsky District, Bashkortostan, Russia. The population was 940 as of 2010. There are 12 streets.

Geography 
Matrayevo is located 55 km east of Zilair (the district's administrative centre) by road. Balapan is the nearest rural locality.

References 

Rural localities in Zilairsky District